Rammellzee (stylized RAMM:ΣLL:ZΣΣ, pronounced "Ram: Ell: Zee"; December 15, 1960 – June 28, 2010) was a visual artist, gothic futurist "graffiti writer", painter, performance artist, art theoretician, sculptor and a hip hop musician from New York City, who has been cited as "instrumental in introducing elements of the avant-garde into hip-hop culture". Since 2021, Rammellzee's work is exclusively represented by Jeffrey Deitch.

Early life 

Rammellzee was born on December 15, 1960 in Far Rockaway, Queens to an African-American mother and Italian father who worked as a transit detective. He grew up in the Carlton Manor Projects near the Far Rockaway–Mott Avenue A train terminal station. His graffiti work started to show up in the 1970s on New York City's subway cars and stations, specifically on the A-train since it was his local train.

Rammellzee studied dentistry at the Clara Barton High School for Health Professions, was a model for Wilhelmina (under the name Mcrammellzee), and briefly studied jewelry design at the Fashion Institute of Technology (FIT).

Career 
Discovered by a larger audience through the 1982 cult movie Wild Style by Charlie Ahearn, Rammellzee's earlier fame in graffiti circles was established when he painted New York subway trains with DONDI, OU3, and Ink 76, and doctor Revolt under his aliases Hyte, Hytestyr, EG (Evolution Griller the Master Killer), Sharissk Boo, Razz, and Maestro on the A, CC, 2 and 5 subway lines.

Rammellzee was an occasional member of the Death Comet Crew, with Stuart Argabright, Michael Diekmann and Shinichi Shimokawa. He also formed the crew Tag Master Killers, consisting of A-One, Delta2, Kool Koor and Toxic.

Rammellzee became a friend and collaborator of artist Jean-Michel Basquiat. In 1982, Rammellzee and Toxic accompanied Basquiat to Los Angeles while he prepared for his show at the Gagosian Gallery. They called themselves the Hollywood Africans as a social and political statement to counter the stereotypical portrayals of African Americans in Hollywood.

The trio are depicted in Basquiat's paintings Hollywood Africans in front of the Chinese Theater with Footprints of Movie Stars (1983) and Hollywood Africans (1983). Rammellzee was an original hip hop artist who introduced specific vocal styles which date back to the early 1980s.

His 12-inch single "Beat Bop," in collaboration with rapper K-Rob and with cover art by Basquiat, is considered by some to be the most valuable (meaning collectible) hip-hop record of all time. "Beat Bop" was also featured in the film Style Wars.

Rammellzee makes a cameo appearance near the end of Jim Jarmusch's 1984 film Stranger Than Paradise. Rammellzee's influence can be heard in artists such as Beastie Boys and Cypress Hill.

In 1988, Rammellzee and his band Gettovetts recorded the album Missionaries Moving, with producer Bill Laswell, a frequent collaborator. Laswell also paired Rammellzee with writer William Burroughs on the 1989 album, Seven Souls, and featured him on several albums recorded by his revolving super-group, Praxis.

He also wrote an opera "The Requiem of Gothic Futurism" in 1985, "offered to send the U.S. military some of the intelligence he had gathered for national defense," and "tried to promote his ideas by producing a comic book and a board game."

Rammellzee was the first artist to collaborate with the streetwear brand Supreme, making hand-painted trucker hats at their first store in 1994.

In 2003, Rammellzee released his debut album, This Is What You Made Me, and performed at the Knitting Factory in New York with the newly reformed Death Comet Crew. Subsequently, Troubleman Unlimited re-released recordings made by DCC between 1982 and 1984.

Their single for Exterior St was featured on the compilation Anti-NY with Ike Yard, Sexual Harassment, and Vivien Goldman, among others. In 2004, Rammellzee released his second album Bi-Conicals of the Rammellzee, produced by Gamma Records.

Gothic Futurism 
Rammellzee's graffiti and art work are based on his theory of Gothic Futurism, which describes the battle between letters and their symbolic warfare against any standardizations enforced by the rules of the alphabet.

His treatise, Ionic treatise Gothic Futurism assassin knowledges of the remanipulated square point's one to 720° to 1440°, details an anarchic plan by which to revise the role and deployment of language in society. Rammellzee performed in self-designed masks and costumes of different characters which represented the "mathematical equation" that is Rammellzee.

On the basis of his Gothic Futurism approach, he described his artistic work as the logical extension into a new phase which he calls Ikonoklast Panzerism. This artistic work has been shown in art galleries throughout the US and Europe. His Letter Racers, and other Noise includes artistic works by individuals mostly identified with their musical contributions.

Afrofuturism 
Rammellzee's work is considered to contribute to the canon of Afrofuturism, primarily through his repeated use of language as a technology. One of the central themes of Afrofuturist content is the use of language as a technology to transcend the Digital Divide.  Conversely, Rammellzee had stated that "there is no such thing as Afro Futurism" and considered his work to be more part of a larger European monastic tradition than any part of an Afrofuturist tradition.

The theory of Gothic Futurism attempts to deconstruct the English language as it is currently conceived. The battle between letters seen in the Ionic treatise deploys language as a technology to fight the oppressive nature of the alphabet. The introduction of a new mythology in the treatise suggests that Rammellzee's language can serve as a force of liberation, thereby lessening the Digital Divide.

In addition, Rammellzee's Letter Racers are intended to pit each individual letter in galactic battles against each other, symbolically challenging the accepted standards and functionality of the 26-letter alphabet.

Rammellzee's description of the Letter Racers is as follows:

"Humans...in the 14th Century the monks ornamented and illustrated the
manuscripts of letters. In the 21st and 22nd century the letters of the alphabet
through competition are now armamented for letter racing and galactic battles. This was made possible by a secret equation known as THE RAMM:ELL:ZEE."

Rammellzee is celebrated in Big Audio Dynamite's song, 'Come On Every Beat Box'.

In 2010 Buckethead released a tribute song called, 'Rammellzee: Hero of the Abyss'.

Personal life 
Rammellzee was married to Carmela Zagari Rammellzee. He died in New York City on June 28, 2010, at the age of 49, having suffered from the exposure to glue, paint fumes, resin and other toxins through his work and from liver problems. The official cause of death was listed as heart disease.

Name 
He legally changed his name to Rammellzee in 1979 and friends who knew his birth name were unwilling to reveal it, in accordance with his wishes. He sometimes went by the shortened name of "Ramm". He has stated that his name is derived from RAM plus M for Magnitude, Sigma (Σ) the first summation operator, first L – longitude, second L – latitude, Z – z-bar, Σ, Σ – summation. He has credited Jamel-Z, a mentor from the Nation of Gods and Earths he met in 1977, with inspiration for his name.

Battle Station 
Rammellzee's live/work loft studio space on 46 Laight Street in the TriBeCa neighborhood, which he shared with his wife Carmela, was named Battlestation. It was a popular place in the 1980s and 1990s for artists to visit, because Rammellzee's artwork and costumes created a unique atmosphere. After 9/11, the building was sold in order to build luxury condos and this forced Rammellzzee and Carmela to move to a smaller place in Battery Park City, and relocate his 20 years worth of artwork into a storage unit. Some of this stored work was included in the 2011 art exhibition, Art in the Streets at Museum of Contemporary Art Los Angeles. In May 2018, Red Bull Arts New York opened its exhibition RAMMΣLLZΣΣ: Racing for Thunder, billed in its press release as "the largest survey to date of one of the most influential yet overlooked artists of the 20th century."

Exhibitions
2021 - Writing the Future: Basquiat and the Hip-Hop Generation - Museum of Fine Arts, Boston - Group
2018 - RAMMΣLLZΣΣ: A Roll of Dice - Lazinc Gallery - London - England - Solo
2018 - Rammellzee - Racing for Thunder - Red Bull Arts - New-York - United States - Solo
2018 - Le musée du street Art et du Graffiti - L'Aérosol - Maquis-art Hall of Fame - Paris - Group
2016 - La Velocità delle immagini (Collection Speerstra) - Institut Suisse de Rome - Italy 
2016 - Graffiti Art - Tableau de légende (Collection Gallizia) - Institut culturel Bernard Magrez - Bordeaux - France - Group
2016 - Pressionnism, graffiti masterpieces on canvas (Collection Gallizia) - Fort Canning Museum - Singapour - France - Group
2015 - Pressionnisme, de Bando à Basquiat (Collection Gallizia) - Pinacothèque de Paris - France - Group
2014 - City as Canvas: Graffiti Art (Collection Martin Wong) - Museum of the City of New York - NY - United States - Group
2013 - The Shadows Took Shape - The Studio Museum in Harlem - New York City -NY - United States - Group
2013 - Urban Art Biennale 2013 - Urban Art Biennale - Völklingen - Germany - Group
2013 - Graffiti, Thanks a Lot - Fun Gallery (Curateur Patti Astor) - New-York - United States - Group
2013 - Tekens aan de Wand: Ferenc Gögös/Graffiti Art - Museum Tongerlohuys - Roosendaal - Netherlands - Group
2013 - White Petals Surround Your Yellow Heart - Institute of Contemporary Art - University of Pennsylvania - Philadelphia - United States - Group
2013 - Last of the Hollywood Africans: Toxic - Londonewcastle Project Space - London - England - Group
2013 - Abstract Mash-Up II: A Group Exhibition - Crown Point Press Gallery - San Francisco - United States - Group
2012 - Radical Presence: Black Performance In Contemporary Art - Contemporary Arts Museum Houston - Houston - United States - Group
2012 - God Save the Queen: Punk in the Netherlands 1977-1984 - Centraal Museum - Utrecht - Netherlands - Group
2012 - Brucennial 2012 - Harder. Betterer. Fasterer - United States - Group
2012 - Strongerer - Brucennial - New York City - United States - Group
2012 - Letter Racers - The Museum of Modern Art - NY - United States - Solo
2012 - Letter Racers - The Suzanne Geiss Company - NY - United States - Solo
2012 - The Rammellzee Galaxseum - Children's Museum of Art - New York - United States - Solo
2011 - Perfect Man II - White Columns - New York City - NY - United States - Group
2011 - Graffiti - New York 80's - Galerie Jérôme de Noirmont - Paris - France - Group 
2012 - Speerstra Fondation (Collection Speerstra) - Apples - Switzerland - Group
2012 - Art in the Streets - The Geffen Contemporary at MOCA - Los Angeles - CA - Group - solo
2011 - L'Art du Graffiti : 40 ans de Pressionnisme (Curateur A.D. Gallizia) - Grimaldi Forum - Monaco - France - Group & solo
2011 - The Aerosol Experience - Zieglerzwei - Zurich - Switzerland - Group
2011 - The Rudolf and Ute Scharpff Collection - Kunstmuseum Stuttgart - Germany - Solo
2010 - Street and Studio - Von Basquiat bis Séripop - Kunsthalle Wien (Museumsquartier) - Vienna - Austria - Group
2010 - Un musée à ciel ouvert (Collections Gallizia-Emerige) - Bâche Wagram - Paris - France - Group
2010 - Printin - The Museum of Modern Art - NY - United States - Group
2010 - Rammellzee: The Equation - Suzanne Geiss's Gallery - New York - United States - Solo
2009 - Gothic Futurism - Galerie Renée Ziegler - Zurich - Switzerland - Solo
2009 - Subcultural Capital - Anonymous Gallery - New York City - NY - United States - Group
2009—The New Yorkers - V1 Gallery - Copenhagen - Denmark - Group
2009 - Ramm:Ell:Zee - Galerie Ziegler SA - Zurich - Switzerland - Solo
2009 - Tag au Grand Palais (Collections Gallizia) - Grand Palais - Paris - France - Group
2007 - Futuro del Futurismo - Gamec -Galleria d'Arte Moderna e Contemporanea di Bergamo - Italy - Group
2007 - Graffiti Stories (Collection Speerstra) - Abbaye d'Auberive et Musée Paul Valéry, Sète - France - Group
2007 -L'art modeste sous les bombes (Collection Speerstra) - Musee International des Arts Modestes - Sete - France - Group
2006 - Music is a Better Noise - MoMA PS1, New York City - NY - Group
2006 - Sound Zero - Kunst Meran - Meran - Italy - Group
2005 - Bi-Conicals of Rammellzee Tour - Venice Biennale - Italy - Solo
2004 - Smile away the parties and champagne - Zeen keuze uit de collectie - Gemeentemuseum Helmond - Boscotondohal, Helmond - Netherlands - Group
2002 - Americas Remixed - Careof – Fabbrica del Vapore - Milan - Italy - Group
2002 -Cowboys en kroegtijgers - Gemeentemuseum Helmond - Boscotondohal - Helmond - Netherlands - Group
2002 - Americas - Fabbrica del Vapore - Milan - Italy - Group
2001 - Oostduitse meisjes en andere stukken - Gemeentemuseum Helmond - Boscotondohal - Helmond - Netherlands - Group
1998 - Smile away the parties and champagne - Gemeentemuseum Helmond - Boscotondohal, Helmond - Netherlands - Group
1994 - Rammellzee vs Gen U One (Gen Atem) - Exercises in Self Presentation - Eigen + Art - New York City - United States - Group
1992 - Coming from the Subway (Collection Speerstra) - Groninger Museum - Netherlands - Group
1991 - American Graffiti: A Survey - Liverpool Gallery - Brussels - Group
1991 - Graffiti Art : Artistes américains et français 1981/1991 (Collection Speerstra) - Musée des monuments Français  Paris - Group
1990 - Rammellzee - Galerie B5/Speerstra Gallery - Monaco - France - Solo
1989 - Hip Hop 'til You Drop - Whitney Museum of American Art - New York - United States - Group
1988 - Love Letters and Death Notes - Barbara Braathen Gallery - New York - NY - Solo
1988 - Comic Iconoclasm - Cornerhouse - Manchester - England - Group
1987 - The Equation - Lidia Carrieri Gallery - Rome - Italy - Solo
1986 - Future Futurism - Barbara Braathen Gallery - New York City - NY - Solo
1986 - Retrospective (Collection Speerstra) - Gemeente museum - Helmond - Netherlands - Group
1985 - 18° Bienal de Sao Paulo - Bienal de Sao Paulo - São Paulo - Brasil - Group
1985 - Ikonoklast Panzerim - Galerie Renée Ziegler - Zurich - Switzerland - Group
1985 - Between Science and Fiction - Bienal de Sao Paulo - Brasil - Group
1984 - Rapid Enamel The Art of Graffiti - The Renaissance Society at The University of Chicago - Group
1984 - Ein anderes klima - a different climate (II) - Kunsthalle Düsseldorf - Dusseldorf - Germany - Group
1984 - Graffiti - Groninger Museum - Groningen - Netherlands - Group
1984 - New York Graffiti (Collection Speerstra) - Louisiana Museum - Humlebaek - Denmark - Group
1984 - Artists from New-York in Monte-Carlo - Speerstra Gallery - Monaco - France - Group
1983 - Post-Graffiti - Sydney Janis Gallery - New-York - United States - Group
1983 - Graffiti, Thanks a Lot - Fun Gallery (Patti Astor) -Group
1983 - Museum Boymans - Van Beuningen - Rotterdam - Netherlands - Group
1982 - New York - Institute of Contemporary Arts - London - England - Group

Collections
Rammellzee's work is held in the following public collection:
Museum of Modern Art, New York: one 12-inch vinyl record (Beat Bop) and a series of ten drawings titled Alphabet, undated 
Museum of Graffiti, Miami

Discography
Studio albums

Singles & EPs

References

External links
 
 
 
 Artist biography at Magical-Secrets.com
 Excerpts from Rammellzee's thesis Iconic Treatise Gothic Futurism
 Interview with Rammellzee
 Video Interview with Guerilla Art
 Red Bull Music and Culture Video Profile "RAMMELLZEE: It's Not Who But What"
 Art gallery
 https://www.sothebys.com/en/buy/auction/2020/dear-keith-works-from-the-personal-collection-of-keith-haring/rammellzee-death-note-intrude-the-prelude-paint-a

1960 births
2010 deaths
American graffiti artists
Rappers from New York City
20th-century American painters
American male painters
American people of Italian descent
21st-century American painters
Painters from New York City
Mass media theorists
People from Far Rockaway, Queens
Postmodern artists
20th-century American printmakers
African-American contemporary artists
American contemporary artists
American contemporary painters
African-American male models
African-American painters
African-American printmakers
20th-century African-American male singers
21st-century African-American artists
20th-century American male artists